Santa Catalina (Jujuy) is a town and municipality in Jujuy Province in Argentina. It is the northernmost permanently inhabited town in Argentina, and is a high altitude mining town (3770 m) where inhabitants also raise llamas and other animals, and cultivate fruit.

References

Populated places in Jujuy Province